Matúš Jorík (born 11 September 1993) is a Slovak football striker who currently plays for the Corgoň Liga club Spartak Myjava.

Spartak Myjava
He made his Corgoň Liga debut for Spartak Myjava against FK Dukla Banská Bystrica on 18 August 2012, Spartak Myjava loss 0-1.

Career statistics

External links
Spartak Myjava profile

eurofotbal.cz

References

1993 births
Living people
Slovak footballers
Association football forwards
Spartak Myjava players
Slovak Super Liga players